The International Socialist Review was a monthly magazine published in Chicago, Illinois by Charles H. Kerr & Co. from 1900 until 1918. The magazine was chiefly a Marxist theoretical journal during its first years under the editorship of A.M. Simons. Beginning in 1908 the publication took a turn to the left with publisher Charles H. Kerr taking over the main editorial task. The later Review (as it was called by its contemporaries) featured heavy use of photographic illustration on glossy paper and mixed news of the contemporary labor movement with its typical theoretical fare.

Loyal to the Socialist Party of America throughout the entire course of its existence, the International Socialist Review after 1908 was recognized as one of the primary voices of the party's left wing. It defended the concept of revolutionary socialism against those who would reduce the Socialist Party to a party of ameliorative reform, expounded upon the syndicalist ideas of the revolutionary industrial union known as the Industrial Workers of the World, consistently fought against the expansion of militarism being pushed forward by the so-called "Preparedness" movement, and provided a vehicle for the leaders of the Zimmerwald Left to relay their ideas to an American audience.

After American intervention in the European World War in 1917, the International Socialist Review came under increasing pressure from the U.S. Post Office Department and United States Department of Justice. Its loss of mailing privileges at the hands of the Wilson administration's Postmaster General, Albert S. Burleson in 1917 sounded the death knell for the publication. The magazine died early in 1918, chiefly due to this government pressure. A brief attempt to revive the publication as The Labor Scrapbook under the editorship of Mary Marcy, Kerr's chief lieutenant, proved unsuccessful in 1918.

Publication history

Simons period (1900–1908)

International Socialist Review was edited from 1900 to 1908 by Algie M. Simons, formerly of Wisconsin. Under Simons, the magazine served as a sounding board for various theoretical questions which were dividing the socialist movement. The magazine gave particular attention to the role of the socialist movement towards the American farmer, an issue held near and dear both by editor Simons (author of a 1902 book on the topic) as well as by J.A. Wayland of the Appeal to Reason, the largest circulation socialist newspaper of its era.

The tone of the early Review was temperate and the policies advocated modest. The publication was fully reflective of what one historian has called "the rather moderate social-democratic perspective of Simons and other Socialists of the 'Center.'"

From its beginnings in the summer of 1900, the publication managed to achieve a modest circulation of about 4,000, about three-quarters of which obtained the publication by mail rather than via sales at newsstands or via bundle orders by local socialist organizations.

Post-Simons period (1908–1918)
Due to a disagreement over fundamental principles, with Simons' views becoming steadily more moderate while those of his employer became increasingly radical, publisher Charles H. Kerr fired editor Simons in 1908. Kerr worked to make the previously dry and academic publication into what he called "the fighting magazine of socialism," making use of dramatic photography in telling the story of contemporary labor struggles against the forces of capitalism. As historian Allen Ruff notes, the revitalized Review took a very different form than its predecessor:

"Liberally illustrated with 'action fotos' and original graphics, the revamped ISR carried firsthand reports of major strikes, lockouts, organizing drives, and employers' offensives as well as theoretical and political discussions. Kerr's work with longtime associates Mary and Leslie Marcy and an editorial board including left-wingers William D. "Big Bill" Haywood, Frank Bohn, and poet/illustrator Ralph Chaplin raised the Review's circulation from nearly 6,000 in 1908 to over 40,000 by 1911."

The Review soon became the major organ of the "left wing" of the Socialist Party, which was critical of what it perceived to be an obsession of many national figures in the party with ameliorative reform. The circulation and influence of the Review was further enhanced with the 1910 termination of The Socialist, a weekly newspaper published in Seattle, Washington by Hermon F. Titus which had gained national attention and readership as a left wing voice. By July 1910, the monthly circulation of the Review had grown to 27,000 copies.

The moderate wing of the Socialist Party was at times sharply critical of The International Socialist Review. Writer Robert Hunter declared in 1911 of the Review:

"It has sneered at Political Action, advocated rival unionism, and vacillated between Anarchism and Proudhonism. The constant emphasis The Review lays on Direct Action and its apparent faith that a revolution can be evoked by Will or Force is in direct opposition to our whole philosophy."

The Review was, in fact, very sympathetic to the Industrial Workers of the World, a revolutionary industrial union which sought to unite all workers regardless of race, craft, or skill under the umbrella of "One Big Union" with a view to the overthrow of the wage system and its replacement with decision-making by economic units established by the workers themselves (syndicalism).

Prominent staff members

 Max S. Hayes
 Charles H. Kerr
 Mary Marcy
 A.M. Simons
 Ernest Untermann

Index of volumes

{| class="wikitable"
|-
! Volume
! First issue
! Last issue
! Editor
! Online availability
|-
! style="text-align:center;"| 1
| style="text-align:center;"| July 1900
| style="text-align:center;"| June 1901
| style="text-align:center;"| Simons
| style="text-align:center;"| Archive.org
|-
! style="text-align:center;"| 2
| style="text-align:center;"| July 1901
| style="text-align:center;"| June 1902
| style="text-align:center;"| Simons
| style="text-align:center;"| Archive.org
|-
! style="text-align:center;"| 3
| style="text-align:center;"| July 1902
| style="text-align:center;"| June 1903
| style="text-align:center;"| Simons
| style="text-align:center;"| Archive.org
|-
! style="text-align:center;"| 4
| style="text-align:center;"| July 1903
| style="text-align:center;"| June 1904
| style="text-align:center;"| Simons
| style="text-align:center;"| Archive.org
|-
! style="text-align:center;"| 5
| style="text-align:center;"| July 1904
| style="text-align:center;"| June 1905
| style="text-align:center;"| Simons
| style="text-align:center;"| Archive.org
|-
! style="text-align:center;"| 6
| style="text-align:center;"| July 1905
| style="text-align:center;"| June 1906
| style="text-align:center;"| Simons
| style="text-align:center;"| Archive.org
|-
! style="text-align:center;"| 7
| style="text-align:center;"| July 1906
| style="text-align:center;"| June 1907
| style="text-align:center;"| Simons
| style="text-align:center;"| Archive.org
|-
! style="text-align:center;"| 8
| style="text-align:center;"| July 1907
| style="text-align:center;"| June 1908
| style="text-align:center;"| Simons/Kerr
| style="text-align:center;"| Archive.org
|-
! style="text-align:center;"| 9
| style="text-align:center;"| July 1908
| style="text-align:center;"| June 1909
| style="text-align:center;"| Kerr
| style="text-align:center;"| Archive.org
|-
! style="text-align:center;"| 10
| style="text-align:center;"| July 1909
| style="text-align:center;"| June 1910
| style="text-align:center;"| Kerr
| style="text-align:center;"| Archive.org
|-
! style="text-align:center;"| 11
| style="text-align:center;"| July 1910
| style="text-align:center;"| June 1911
| style="text-align:center;"| Kerr
| style="text-align:center;"| Archive.org
|-
! style="text-align:center;"| 12
| style="text-align:center;"| July 1911
| style="text-align:center;"| June 1912
| style="text-align:center;"| Kerr
| style="text-align:center;"| Archive.org
|-
! style="text-align:center;"| 13
| style="text-align:center;"| July 1912
| style="text-align:center;"| June 1913
| style="text-align:center;"| Kerr
| style="text-align:center;"| Archive.org
|-
! style="text-align:center;"| 14
| style="text-align:center;"| July 1913
| style="text-align:center;"| June 1914
| style="text-align:center;"| Kerr
| style="text-align:center;"| Archive.org
|-
! style="text-align:center;"| 15
| style="text-align:center;"| July 1914
| style="text-align:center;"| June 1915
| style="text-align:center;"| Kerr
| style="text-align:center;"| Archive.org
|-
! style="text-align:center;"| 16
| style="text-align:center;"| July 1915
| style="text-align:center;"| June 1916
| style="text-align:center;"| Kerr
| style="text-align:center;"| Archive.org
|-
! style="text-align:center;"| 17
| style="text-align:center;"| July 1916
| style="text-align:center;"| June 1917
| style="text-align:center;"| Kerr
| style="text-align:center;"| Archive.org
|-
! style="text-align:center;"| 18
| style="text-align:center;"| July 1917
| style="text-align:center;"| February 1918
| style="text-align:center;"| Kerr
| style="text-align:center;"| Archive.org
|}

References

Further reading
 Allen Ruff, "We Called Each Other Comrade": Charles H. Kerr & Co., Radical Publishers. Urbana: University of Illinois Press, 1997.

External sources
 International Socialist Review at the Marxists Internet Archive

1900 establishments in Illinois
1918 disestablishments in Illinois
Monthly magazines published in the United States
News magazines published in the United States
Defunct political magazines published in the United States]
Industrial Workers of the World in the United States
Magazines established in 1900
Magazines disestablished in 1918
Magazines published in Chicago
Marxist magazines
Socialist magazines
Socialist Party of America publications